Events in the year 1333 in Japan.

Incumbents
Monarch: Go-Daigo

Events
Spring - Emperor Go-Daigo escapes the Oki Islands through the help of Nawa Nagatoshi. The Kenmu Restoration begins.
June 19 - Ashikaga Takauji leads his army into Kyoto as part of the Kenmu Restoration
End of July - The Genkō War ends and Emperor Go-Daigo entered the Imperial palace

References

 
 
Japan
Years of the 14th century in Japan